Rush County is a county in the U.S. state of Indiana. In the 2010 United States Census, the population was 17,392. The county seat (and only city) is Rushville.

History
When the Indiana Territory was granted statehood (20 December 1816), there were no settlers on the lands of the future Rush County. However, this changed quickly, and by 1821 the newly founded settlements were desirous of being organized into a county unit. Accordingly, the state legislature passed an act dated 31 December 1821 which authorized Rush County, effective 1 April, and further authorized the first commissioners (pro tem) to begin organizing the county's governing structure on 3 June 1822. The act also authorized six townships to cover the county; subsequent growth through the years has caused the number of townships to double. It was named for Dr. Benjamin Rush, one of the signers of the 1776 Declaration of Independence. That same summer (1822) the future town (and county seat) of Rushville was platted and laid out.

Geography
In the 1820s the low rolling hills of Rush County were generously covered with trees, usually walnut and sugar maples. By 1879 Rush County was the state's largest producer of maple syrup. However, logging and clearing for agriculture have completely removed the trees, except for stands in drainages, and the available land is completely devoted to agriculture or urban development. The Big Blue River drains the upper part of the county, flowing to the southwest. The Little Blue River flows southwest to drain the central part of the county, and Flatrock River flows south-southwest through the lower central part of the county. The terrain's highest point (1,135 feet/346 m ASL) is an isolated rise at the county's east boundary, 1.4 mile (2.2 km) SSW of Glenwood.

Adjacent counties

 Henry County - north
 Fayette County - east
 Franklin County - southeast
 Decatur County - south
 Shelby County - west
 Hancock County - northwest

Cities and towns
 Carthage
 Glenwood
 Rushville (city/county seat)

Census-designated places
 Arlington
 Manilla
 Milroy

Unincorporated towns

 Boyd
 Charlottesville
 Circleville
 Fairview
 Falmouth
 Farmers
 Farmington
 Gings
 Gowdy
 Henderson
 Henry
 Homer
 Mauzy
 Mays
 Moscow
 New Salem
 Occident
 Raleigh
 Richland
 Sexton
 Sulphur Spring
 Williamstown

Townships

 Anderson
 Center
 Jackson
 Noble
 Orange
 Posey
 Richland
 Ripley
 Rushville
 Union
 Walker
 Washington

Major highways

  /  Interstate 74/U.S. Route 421**
  U.S. Route 52
  Indiana State Road 3
  Indiana State Road 44
  Indiana State Road 140
  Indiana State Road 244

Climate and weather

Government

The county government is a constitutional body, and is granted specific powers by the Constitution of Indiana, and by the Indiana Code.

County Council: The legislative branch of the county government; controls spending and revenue collection in the county. Representatives are elected to four-year terms from county districts. They set salaries, the annual budget, and special spending. The council has limited authority to impose local taxes, in the form of an income and property tax that is subject to state level approval, excise taxes, and service taxes.

Board of Commissioners: The executive body of the county; commissioners are elected county-wide to staggered four-year terms. One commissioner serves as president. The commissioners execute acts legislated by the council, collect revenue, and manage the county government.

County Officials: The county has other elected offices, including sheriff, coroner, auditor, treasurer, recorder, surveyor and circuit court clerk. These officers are elected to four-year terms. Members elected to county government positions are required to declare party affiliations and to be residents of the county.

Demographics

2010 Census
As of the 2010 United States Census, there were 17,392 people, 6,767 households, and 4,803 families in the county. The racial makeup of the county was 97.4% white, 0.8% black or African American, 0.3% Asian, 0.2% American Indian, 0.5% from other races, and 0.8% from two or more races. Those of Hispanic or Latino origin made up 1.1% of the population. In terms of ancestry, 23.4% were German, 16.8% were American, 12.0% were Irish, and 11.9% were English.

Of the 6,767 households, 32.8% had children under the age of 18 living with them, 54.9% were married couples living together, 10.9% had a female householder with no husband present, 29.0% were non-families, and 24.5% of all households were made up of individuals. The average household size was 2.54 and the average family size was 2.99. The median age was 40.6 years.

The median income for a household in the county was $47,697 and the median income for a family was $52,874. Males had a median income of $41,581 versus $30,035 for females. The per capita income for the county was $21,215. About 10.3% of families and 12.8% of the population were below the poverty line, including 17.4% of those under age 18 and 9.3% of those age 65 or over.

See also
 National Register of Historic Places listings in Rush County, Indiana
 Edward E. Moore, Indiana state senator and Los Angeles City Council member

References

External links
 County website
 History of Rush County, Indiana

 
Indiana counties
1822 establishments in Indiana
Populated places established in 1822